Alan, Allan or Allen Morgan may refer to:

Alan Morgan (footballer, born 1973), Welsh football player
Alan Morgan (footballer, born 1983), Scottish football player
Alan Morgan (politician), South Carolina politician
Alan Morgan (sailor) (1909–1984), American sailor
Alan V. Morgan, professor in earth sciences at the University of Waterloo, winner of the E. R. Ward Neale Medal
Alan Morgan (bishop) (1940–2011), bishop of Sherwood
Allen Morgan (ornithologist) (1925–1990), American ornithologist
Allen Morgan (rowing) (1925–2011), American coxswain
Allen B. Morgan Jr., brokerage founder
Allen Morgan (priest) (1761–1830), Anglican priest in Ireland

See also
Al Morgan (disambiguation)